Francisco Barbosa "Fran" Vieites (born 7 May 1999) is a Spanish footballer who plays for Betis Deportivo Balompié as a goalkeeper.

Club career
Born in Pontecesures, Pontevedra, Galicia, Vieites started his career with Bertamiráns FC, and made his first team debut at the age of only 15 on 20 March 2015, coming on as a late substitute in a 0–5 Tercera División loss against CCD Cerceda. On 10 June, he joined RC Celta de Vigo and returned to the youth setup.

Vieites was promoted to the reserves ahead of the 2018–19 season, but was only a third-choice. He became a regular starter in 2019–20, contributing with 15 appearances as the league was curtailed due to the COVID-19 pandemic.

On 7 September 2020, Vieites signed a four-year contract with Segunda División side CD Lugo. After spending his first season as a third-choice behind Ander Cantero and Alberto Varo, he made his professional debut on 18 September 2021 by starting in a 1–2 away loss against FC Cartagena.

On 1 July 2022, Vieites terminated his contract with Lugo, and signed a two-year deal with Real Betis' reserves in Segunda Federación.

References

External links

1999 births
Living people
People from Caldas (comarca)
Sportspeople from the Province of Pontevedra
Spanish footballers
Footballers from Galicia (Spain)
Association football goalkeepers
Segunda División players
Segunda División B players
Tercera División players
Celta de Vigo B players
CD Lugo players
Betis Deportivo Balompié footballers